PNS Saif (FFG-253) is a F-22P Zulfiquar-class guided missile frigate which serves as the front line warship of the Pakistan Navy since her commission in 2010.

Operational history
 
Saif was constructed and built in China by Hudong-Zhonghua Shipyard Co. where her keel laying was performed. Saif was subjected to the extensive sea trials conducted by the Pakistan Navy in China under Captain Zubair Shafiq on June-July 2010, and was acquired on 9 November 2010.

On 19 September 2010, Saif was commissioned into the military services of the Pakistan Navy with Adm. Noman Bashir overseeing her commissioning ceremony in China. She is the second warship to have the name Saif, which is a talwar or sword. Her commissioning ended the construction phase of the project in China.

Gallery

References

F-22P Zulfiquar-class frigate
2009 ships
Ships built in China